Getting It Right is a 1989 British-American comedy-drama film starring Jesse Birdsall, Jane Horrocks, and Helena Bonham Carter. The tagline was: "Gavin is 31... and a virgin. One wild night and three women later, he's finally... Getting It Right"

Synopsis
The film concerns the late coming of age of protagonist Gavin Lamb (Birdsall), a painfully shy 31-year-old virgin still living at home with his parents and who works as a hairdresser in a West End salon. The socially awkward Gavin forges sudden romantic connections with three very different women: a sultry millionairess (Redgrave), an idiosyncratic recluse (Bonham Carter), and a single mother (Horrocks) who is a junior hairdresser at his salon.

Cast
 Jesse Birdsall as Gavin Lamb 
 Jane Horrocks as Jenny 
 Helena Bonham Carter as Lady Minerva Munday 
 Pat Heywood as Mrs. Lamb 
 Bryan Pringle as Mr. Lamb 
 Lynn Redgrave as Joan 
 Richard Huw as Harry 
 John Gielgud as Sir Gordon Munday 
 Judy Parfitt as Lady Stella Munday 
 Peter Cook as Mr. Adrian 
 Shirley Anne Field as Anne 
 Ian Redford as Bill 
 Kevin Drinkwater as Winthrop 
 Rupert Holliday-Evans as Peter 
 June Ellis as Mrs. Wagstaffe

Theme
The film's theme song, also titled "Getting it Right", was sung by Dusty Springfield.

Box office
It made £88,787 in the UK.

References

External links

1989 films
1980s coming-of-age comedy-drama films
British coming-of-age comedy-drama films
1980s English-language films
Films about virginity
Films directed by Randal Kleiser
British sex comedy films
Films based on British novels
Films scored by Colin Towns
1980s sex comedy films
1989 comedy films
1989 drama films
1980s British films